Black President is the debut album by American punk rock band Black President.

Track listing

 "Intro" – 0:08
 "Last Fucking Hope" – 3:10
 "So Negative" – 2:16
 "Not Enough" – 2:41
 "Short List of Outspoken Suspects" – 1:25
 "Neon" – 3:40
 "Who Do You Trust?" – 1:19
 "Watch You Drink" – 3:16
 "Vacate the Vatican" – 1:59
 "Halleujah" – 3:21
 "Not Amused" – 1:56
 "Ask Your Daddy" – 2:41
 "Gaslamp James' Campaign Speech" – 0:15
 "Elected" – 3:19
 "Iron Fist" (bonus track) – 2:58

Personnel
 Christian Martucci – vocals, guitar
 Charlie Paulson – guitar
 Jason Christopher – bass, vocals
 Roy Mayorga – drums

External links

2008 albums
Black President (band) albums